Anthidium toro is a species of bee in the family Megachilidae, the leaf-cutter, carder, or mason bees.

Distribution
Chile

References

toro
Insects described in 2001
Endemic fauna of Chile